The black-hooded antwren (Formicivora erythronotos) is a species of bird in the family Thamnophilidae, the antbirds. It is endemic to Brazil, where it is known only from the vicinity of Ilha Grande Bay in the southern part of the state of Rio de Janeiro. It was collected and then not seen for 100 years until it was rediscovered in 1987. It is now known from seven sites. Its range is small and its habitat is fragmented.

This bird is protected by the nation of Brazil. It was placed on the Endangered Species List of the United States in 2010.

The black-hooded antwren is roughly 11 centimeters long. The male is black in color with a reddish back and three white bars on the wings. The bill is black and the tail is long. The female is similar to the male, except brownish olive in color instead of black.

The bird lives in old-growth and secondary growth forest, restinga, and abandoned banana plantations. It eats insects, spiders, and small frogs. The cup-shaped nest is made of vegetation and the female lays two eggs. Both male and female tend the young.

There is a single population consisting of 1000 to 2499 individuals.

References

black-hooded antwren
Birds of the Atlantic Forest
Endemic birds of Brazil
black-hooded antwren
Taxonomy articles created by Polbot